Route 364 is a state highway in central Connecticut running from Southington to Berlin.

Route description
Route 364 begins at an intersection with Route 120 near the Southington town center and heads east to Berlin.  In Berlin, it continues northeast and east to end at an intersection with Route 71.

History
Route 364 was commissioned from SR 564 in 1963 and has had no significant changes since. SR 564 was designated only the year before as part of the 1962 Route Reclassification Act.

Junction list

References

External links

364
Transportation in Hartford County, Connecticut